Didier Danio (born 10 May 1962) is a French former professional footballer who played as a defensive midfielder. In his career, he played for INF Vichy, Auxerre, Rennes, Reims, Nancy, and Lorient.

Honours 
INF Vichy

 Coupe Gambardella: 1979–80

Lorient

 Championnat National: 1994–95

References 

1962 births
Living people
Sportspeople from Toulon
French footballers
Association football midfielders
INF Vichy players
AJ Auxerre players
Stade Rennais F.C. players
Stade de Reims players
AS Nancy Lorraine players
FC Lorient players

French Division 3 (1971–1993) players
Ligue 1 players
Ligue 2 players
Championnat National players
Footballers from Provence-Alpes-Côte d'Azur